The following is a list of characters from the ITV sitcom Man About the House, which was originally broadcast from 1973 to 1976.

List of characters

Main
Richard O'Sullivan as Robin Tripp
Paula Wilcox as Chrissy Plummer
Sally Thomsett as Jo

Supporting
Yootha Joyce as Mildred Roper
Brian Murphy as George Roper
Doug Fisher as Larry Simmonds

Recurring
Norman Eshley as Ian Cross and Norman Tripp
Roy Kinnear as Jerry
Daphne Oxenford as Mrs Plummer
Jenny Hanley as Liz
John Carlin as the Barman

Descriptions

Robin Tripp
Played by Richard O'Sullivan

The sex mad cookery student Robin Tripp is from Southampton. He moves in with the two girls Chrissy and Jo after they find him in their bath (with his clothes on!) after the girls held a party the previous night. Robin was raised on a farm in the middle of the countryside and is frequently asked by his mother and father to rejoin them in the family business of making pipes. He is always bringing his girlfriends over and is usually unsuccessful. He is a fan of Southampton F.C. and Fulham F.C. and attends their matches. Robin is best friends with Larry.

Chrissy Plummer
Played by Paula Wilcox

Chrissy lives in the flat, whom Mildred and George Roper are caretakers of, with Jo, then Robin moves in. She is often taken out by men in all different shapes, sizes and natures. Chrissy is fond of tending her flowers on the balcony, and always prefers her or Robin's cooking as Jo's is always dreadful. She has a sister named Susan who is married to Ted, whom her father dislikes. Chrissy's mother visits Chrissy at the flat and is pressures her to get married. Chrissy detests Larry living upstairs.

Jo
Played by Sally Thomsett

Jo, the dippy blonde dolly bird who is rubbish at cooking, is very keen on having parties in the flat with loud music, the opposite of the Ropers! She is always forgetting things and is always doing things wrong. Jo is often asked out by the men at the local pub and does not get on with Larry, like Chrissy, her best friend.

Mildred Roper
Played by Yootha Joyce

Mildred is the long suffering wife of George who is always getting on her nerves. Whether she buys a new hat or armchair, George is not bothered. It is hinted that she used to have many flings with men when she used to work at an airbase during the war. Mildred has a sister called Ethel, who is a snob and is disliked by George and many others. She also has a sexual interest in Robin. Mildred dislikes Jerry, George's best friend and odd-job man who is usually conning people.

George Roland Roper
Played by Brian Murphy

The dim, lazy husband of Mildred Roper is either at the pub, arguing with Mildred or watching his television set, which often breaks down. George sometimes meets the flatmates in the local pub and is known to be fond of having a Scotch. George is easily led. It was implied in the spin-off series George and Mildred that he was one of seven children.

Larry Simmonds
Played by Doug Fisher

Larry is the best friend of Robin and the neighbour of Robin, Chrissy and Jo as he lives upstairs in the newly refurbished attic. He frequently visits Robin's flat to borrow things and never gives them back. Larry used to live in another flat but was evicted as he was not paying his rent. He often brings girls of all natures home, but, as he tells Robin, he never gives his real name and usually gives false ones, one once being Robin Tripp!

Norman Tripp
Played by Norman Eshley

Norman Tripp is Robin's brother who is only seen at the end of the series, not being mentioned before then. He comes to stay with Robin for a few days and starts a relationship with Chrissy. They then arrange to get married and the day before Norman and Chrissy's wedding and Mildred is upset that she has not received an invitation. However, when she delivers their wedding present she discovers that they have been invited and that George has hidden it from her because he wants to go to a darts match. Norman eventually marries Chrissy, and they presumably start a new life together.

Jerry
Played by Roy Kinnear

The incompetent odd job man who is often persuaded by George to get him to do various jobs around the flat that do not even need doing. Apart from George, he is disliked by all, especially Mildred. He once tried to get Robin, Chrissy and Jo evicted so he could subdivide the flat into smaller units. He also diagnosed one of the doors in the flat as having woodworm despite there being a perfect circle of unmarked wood and a dartboard lying on the floor - the holes were created by missed darts!

Mrs Plummer
Played by Daphne Oxenford

Chrissy's mother often bothers Chrissy by pressuring her to marry, and annoys Robin. On the day of Chrissy's sister Susan's baby's christening, she goes on that much about Chrissy and Robin getting married that they return home.

Liz Martin
Played by Jenny Hanley

Liz Martin is Robin's girlfriend who appears in two episodes. Her first appearance sees her trying to sneak into the flat to spend some time with Robin. It is shown that she has many flings with men and when she is invited to Robin, Chrissy and Jo's party, she stays the whole time with Chrissy's boyfriend, Mark (played by Ian Lavender). Neither are seen again in the series.

Jim the Barman
Played by Michael Segal

Seen in the first two series, Jim is the friendly barman at the local pub, The Mucky Duck. He often helps Robin out by giving him alcohol 'on the slate' for parties.

The Barman
Played by John Carlin

The camp Scottish barman at the pub, sometimes referred to as Percy, is obviously homosexual and frequently misunderstands what people say, thinking that it is something sexual. He is very friendly to all, especially Robin, Larry and Mr Roper.

Dr. McCleod
Played by Duncan Lamont

The local doctor, who appears in two episodes, McCleod treats Robin for flu before his football match and appears again in the episode "Three of a Kind".

References

Man About the House
Characters